M.A. Jean Moloise Ogoudjobi (born 23 October 1985) is a Beninese taekwondo practitioner. 

He competed in the men's 58 kg taekwondo event at the 2008 Summer Olympics but was eliminated in the first round by losing to Chutchawal Khawlaor of Thailand 4-2.

External links
Profile from Sports-Reference

1985 births
Living people
Beninese male taekwondo practitioners
Taekwondo practitioners at the 2008 Summer Olympics
Olympic taekwondo practitioners of Benin